Gotse Delchev was a Macedonian Bulgarian revolutionary.

Gotse Delchev or Goce Delčev may also refer to:
Gotse Delchev (town), a town in southwestern Bulgaria
Gotse Delchev Municipality, Bulgaria
Goce Delčev, Gazi Baba, a village in North Macedonia
Gotse Delchev Brigade, a military unit during WWII